Closter Road–Oak Tree Road Historic District is a national historic district located at Palisades in Rockland County, New York.  It encompasses 18 contributing buildings and one contributing site.  The district consists of 19 properties that reflect the historic core of the hamlet.  It contains residential, commercial, religious, and civic properties of architectural and historic significance dating from the closing years of the 18th century to the first decade of the 20th.

It was listed on the National Register of Historic Places in 1990.

References

Historic districts on the National Register of Historic Places in New York (state)
Houses on the National Register of Historic Places in New York (state)
Gothic Revival architecture in New York (state)
Italianate architecture in New York (state)
Historic districts in Rockland County, New York
Houses in Rockland County, New York
National Register of Historic Places in Rockland County, New York